Swahid Peoli Phukan College, established in 1970, is a general degree college situated at Namti, in Sibsagar district, Assam. This college is affiliated with the Dibrugarh University.

Departments

Science
Physics
Mathematics
Chemistry
Geology
Botany
Zoology

Arts and Commerce
Assamese
English
History
Education
Economics
Sociology
Political Science
Geography
Commerce

References

External links

Universities and colleges in Assam
Colleges affiliated to Dibrugarh University
Educational institutions established in 1970
1970 establishments in Assam